Tarnica Golisano (born 21 September 1996) is an Australian rules footballer who played for the Fremantle Football Club in the AFL Women's competition. Golisano was recruited by Fremantle as a free agent in October 2016. She struggled to maintain a spot in the best 23 players and finished the season with four matches, before being delisted at the end of the 2017 season. Golisano is a qualified personal trainer/gym instructor.

References

External links 

1996 births
Living people
Fremantle Football Club (AFLW) players
Australian rules footballers from Western Australia